Łubne  (Lubne) is a former village in the administrative district of Gmina Baligród, within Lesko County, Podkarpackie Voivodeship, in south-eastern Poland.

References

Villages in Lesko County